GURPS Cyberpunk is a genre toolkit for cyberpunk-themed role-playing games set in a near-future dystopia, such as that envisioned by William Gibson in his influential novel Neuromancer. It was published in 1990 after a significant delay caused by the original draft being a primary piece of evidence in Steve Jackson Games, Inc. v. United States Secret Service.

In 1993, GURPS Cyberpunk Adventures — a collection of three RPG scenarios in the GURPS Cyberpunk line — won the Origins Award for Best Roleplaying Adventure of 1992.

Unlike most commercially successful books from the third edition of the game, there is currently no Cyberpunk sourcebook for its fourth edition, as of 2023. Similar rules for advanced technology can be found in GURPS Ultra-Tech, from gadgets to cyberwear, but there aren't, for example, rules for netrunning which are essential for such games.

Contents
Besides the main chapters detailed below, GURPS Cyberpunk contains a glossary of common cyberpunk terms, an index, and a bibliography of relevant media.

Characters  This chapter describes some of the most common character archetypes (netrunner, corp(orate), cop, celebrity, etc.) and their typical skills, advantages, and disadvantages. It also provides a guideline about how much money a given job might bring or cost.
 Cyberwear  Rules for and descriptions of bionic enhancements.
 Technology & Equipment  Lists many sorts of near-future gadgets.
 Netrunning  The longest in the book, it details rules for realistic computer networks as well as fantastic cyberspaces accessible only through a neural interface. It describes what types of system can be found in the Net and how the characters can act (and fight) there.
 World Design  Gives guidelines for designing your own cyberpunk world.
 Campaigning  Helps the Gamemaster in running a longer series of adventures.

U.S. Secret Service seizure

Loyd Blankenship, who was hired by Steve Jackson Games in 1989, was nearly finished with GURPS Cyberpunk later that year, which was intended both to introduce the company into the popular cyberpunk genre, and to help the company get over its financial difficulties.

GURPS Cyberpunk received notoriety when the Austin headquarters of Steve Jackson Games was raided by the U.S. Secret Service in 1990. The authorities seized the manuscript for the sourcebook, which was under development at the time, asserting that it was a "handbook for computer crime". The book was reconstructed and rewritten from older drafts when the manuscript was not returned. The seizure delayed publication for six weeks. This raid is often wrongly attributed to Operation Sundevil, a nationwide crackdown on illegal computer hacking activities that was occurring about this time.

GURPS Cyberpunk was ultimately published in 1990, joining the already-released cyberpunk role-playing games Cyberpunk 2013 (1988) from R. Talsorian, Cyberspace (1989) from ICE, and Shadowrun (1989) from FASA.

Publication history
The main sourcebook for the line was written by Loyd Blankenship and published by Steve Jackson Games in 1990, as a part of the extensive (3rd-edition) GURPS generic role-playing game system.

Reception
The July 1990 edition of Games International (Issue 16) commented that "computers interfaced with humans and piles of personal morality make playing cyberpunk a challenge." The reviewer concluded, "Lovers of William Gibson's Neuromancer should start here."

Awards
At the 1991 Origins Awards, GURPS Cyberpunk was a nominee for Best Roleplaying Supplement of 1990.

Other reviews
White Wolf #23
Dragão Brasil #3 (1994) (Portuguese)

References

External links 
 Official GURPS Cyberpunk page on the SJ Games website
 SJ Games vs. the Secret Service from Steve Jackson Games website
 EFF: Steve Jackson Games v. Secret Service Case Archive
 Steve Jackson Games case decision
 On-line and Out-of-Bounds
 Bruce Sterling GURPS' labour lost

Cyberpunk role-playing games
Cyberpunk
Origins Award winners
Role-playing game supplements introduced in 1990
Works about computer hacking